Rebel, Sweetheart is The Wallflowers' fifth album, released in 2005. The two singles released from this album were "The Beautiful Side of Somewhere" and "God Says Nothing Back." The single "The Beautiful Side of Somewhere" hit #5 on AAA radio stations.

The album has sold approximately 116,000 copies, according to Billboard and Nielsen Soundscan.

Reception
The album received a score of 73 out of 100 on Metacritic, indicating "generally positive reviews." In a positive review, Allmusic wrote "not that Rebel, Sweetheart offers anything all that different from previous Wallflowers albums -- they just do what they do better than they have before." RollingStone magazine also praised the album, writing "Dylan sings these adult tales of disillusionment and perseverance with the gritty timbre of a young Warren Zevon" while naming "Here He Comes (Confessions of a Drunken Marionette)" as the standout track on the album. Other reviews were less positive, with Uncut magazine giving it 6 out of 10 stars and calling it "accomplished but seldom inspired." 

In an interview with Uproxx in 2021, Dylan fondly remembered recording the album with Brendan O'Brien and said he still likes the album "quite a bit." He commented that "sonically, it sounds very similar to those Bruce Springsteen records that Brendan was making at the time"

Track listing
All songs written by Jakob Dylan.
 "Days of Wonder" – 5:14
 "The Passenger" – 2:54
 "The Beautiful Side of Somewhere" – 4:00 
 "Here He Comes (Confessions of a Drunken Marionette)" – 3:41
 "We're Already There" – 4:37
 "God Says Nothing Back" – 4:47
 "Back to California" – 3:35
 "I Am a Building" – 3:47
 "From the Bottom of My Heart" – 6:12 
 "Nearly Beloved" – 4:00 
 "How Far You've Come" – 3:26
 "All Things New Again" – 3:45

British bonus track
"Just One Breath Away" – 4:16

Japanese bonus track
"Nothing to See Here" – 3:40

Personnel
The Wallflowers
Jakob Dylan – guitars, lead vocals
Fred Eltringham – drums, percussion
Rami Jaffee – keyboards, backing vocals
Greg Richling – bass guitar

Additional personnel
Brendan O'Brien – production

References

2005 albums
Albums produced by Brendan O'Brien (record producer)
Interscope Records albums
The Wallflowers albums